Sultan Daud Mahamed is the ninth and current Grand Sultan of the Isaaq Sultanate. He was crowned on 13 February 2021 in Hargeisa, capital of Somaliland, a day after his father Sultan Mahamed Abdiqadir died, in a ceremony held beside the grave of his father, per the traditions of the Isaaq.

See also 

Somalia–Somaliland border
Ethiopia–Somaliland border

References 

Muslim monarchs
African Muslims
Somali sultans
Year of birth missing (living people)
Grand Sultans of the Isaaq Sultanate
Living people
Somaliland people